There are two rivers named Uberaba River in Brazil:

 Uberaba River (Minas Gerais)
 Uberaba River (Paraná)

See also
 Uberaba, a municipality in Minas Gerais, Brazil